The Aquarium is an indie rock band from Washington, D.C., United States. The band is a duo, consisting of Jason Hutto, formerly of Motor-Cycle Wars (electric piano, keyboard, vocals) and Laura Harris (drums), who now performs in Ex Hex and has toured as a member of Death Valley Girls 
. The group was founded in 2002. Their music has been described as "catchy, vibrant, and slightly trippy".

The band's debut LP was released on the Dischord record label in October 2006.

Discography
The Aquarium (2006) (LP)
Performer (2009) (EP)

References

External links
Dischord Records
Official Website
Review of self-titled LP on Aversion.com
Review of January 2007 live show

Dischord Records artists
Indie rock musical groups from Washington, D.C.
Musical groups established in 2002
Musical groups from Washington, D.C.
2002 establishments in Washington, D.C.